Lake Ridge is a census-designated place (CDP) in Prince William County, Virginia, United States. It is an annex of Woodbridge, Virginia. The population was 41,058 at the 2010 census, an increase of 35% from 2000.

History
Lake Ridge was started in the late 1960s when Sorensen Construction Corporation began building in the area now known as East Lake Ridge.

By 1969, the first five developments had begun, named Thousand Oaks, The Point, Plantation Harbor, The Village of Lake Ridge, and The Hamlet.

Lake Ridge Parks and Recreation was formed in 1972 as the HOA for the area.  The community grew rapidly throughout the 70s and 80s from about 3350 homes in 1983 to approximately 6600 in 1990.  Lake Ridge as it is now was completed in the late 1990s with the completion of Ridgeleigh. Lake Ridge has about 7700 housing units, in more than 70 subdivisions and 9 condominium complexes. Most of the houses were built after 1972.

Geography
Lake Ridge is at  (38.688190, −77.308953), along Old Bridge Road between Harbor Drive and Westridge Drive.

According to the United States Census Bureau, the CDP has a total area of 8.6 square miles (22.4 km), of which, 8.2 square miles (21.3 km) of it is land and 0.4 square miles (1.0 km) of it (4.63%) is water.

People
At the 2000 census there were 30,404 people, 10,980 households, and 8,103 families in the CDP. The racial makeup of the CDP was 74.38% White, 16.02% African American, 0.24% Native American, 3.53% Asian, 0.13% Pacific Islander, 2.20% from other races, and 3.50% from two or more races. Hispanics and Latinos of any race were 7.11%.

Of the 10,980 households 42.6% had children under the age of 18 living with them, 58.9% were married couples living together, 11.4% had a female householder with no husband present, and 26.2% were non-families. 20.1% of households were one person and 4.0% were one person aged 65 or older. The average household size was 2.76 and the average family size was 3.21.

The age distribution was 29.5% under the age of 18, 7.5% from 18 to 24, 34.4% from 25 to 44, 23.6% from 45 to 64, and 5.0% 65 or older. The median age was 34 years. For every 100 females, there were 92.4 males. For every 100 females age 18 and over, there were 88.4 males.

According to a 2007 estimate, the median household income was $93,430, and the median family income  was $103,310. Males had a median income of $55,182 versus $36,726 for females. The per capita income for the CDP was $30,506. About 1.7% of families and 2.3% of the population were below the poverty line, including 2.5% of those under age 18 and 2.3% of those age 65 or over.

Residents of Lake Ridge and West Ridge are represented in Virginia's House of Delegates by Briana Sewell.

Nearby communities 
 Clifton
 Dale City
 Lorton
 Occoquan
 Woodbridge

Recreation
There is a yard sale and festival each fall.

Notable residents 
Elizabeth Peet McIntosh, OSS agent in WWII

References

External links

 Prince William County Government
 Lake Ridge Parks and Recreation Association
 "Ridge Runners" Running Club
 Prince William Conservation Alliance

Census-designated places in Virginia
Census-designated places in Prince William County, Virginia
Washington metropolitan area